The Orocovis River is a river of Orocovis, Morovis, and Corozal, municipalities in Puerto Rico.

Gallery
Orocovis River from bridge on PR-155, Río Grande barrio, Morovis

See also
List of rivers of Puerto Rico

References

External links
USGS Hydrologic Unit Map – Caribbean Region (1974)
Rios de Puerto Rico

Rivers of Puerto Rico